Nikola Kedžo (born 12 August 1988) is a Croatian handball handball player who plays for Riihimäen Cocks.

References
 EHF profile

1988 births
Living people
Croatian male handball players